Lead Mosque  may refer to:
 Lead Mosque, Shkodër in Shkodër, Albania
 Lead Mosque, Berat in Berat, Albania
 Lead Mosque (Xhamia Muradie) in Vlora, Albania
 Leaden Mosque in Trikala, Greece
 Lead Mosque and Complex in Eskishehir, Turkey

Mosque disambiguation pages